Sjællands Odde is a  peninsula  on the northwest coast of Zealand between the Kattegat and Sejerø Bay. From the outermost point of the peninsula, Gniben, a reef juts some  out into the Kattegat.

Geography
In the Stone Age Sjællands Odde was a series of islands, but deposits over thousands of years have made it part of Zealand.

Sjællands Odde is hilly at both ends, with the north side of the central section almost at sea level. The landscape is dotted with farms. The largest area of protected nature is Yderby Lyng on the south coast of the peninsula.

History

The naval Battle of Zealand Point was fought in the seas around here in 1808, resulting in the sinking of the Danish ship of the line Category:Prinds Christian Frederik.

From the late 19th century until 1972m, Tderby Lyng on Sjællands Odde was used as a stone quarry. The stone and gravel was used in the construction of the Kiel Canal as well as Danish roads and railways.  A small fishing harbour was established at Havnebyen on the north coast of the peninsula in 190708. In the 1920s, Sjællands Odde developed into a popular destination for sports fishermen to go tuna  tunafish.

During World War II, when Denmark was occupied, Nazi Germany established a military installation at the tip of Sjællands Odde (Gniben) to control the a submarine barrier in the Kattegat. After the war, it was converted into a military training ground for the Danish artillery. Artilleriskolen Sjællands Odde was officially inaugurated in 1951.

Landmarks

The village of Havnebyen, some 3 km from the ferry port, has a small harbour with eating places and fish outlets. The still-in-use Røgeriet snokehouse was designed by Arne Jacobsen. Jacobsen has also designed a round, Modernist villa on an adjacent site. Constructed for the owner of the smokehouse in 1956, it was listed in the Danish registry of protected buildings and places in 2000.

The distinctively red Odden Church features frescoes of flowers and leaf decorations with bird motifs. In the churchyard is a monument to naval hero Willemoes, who died during a major sea battle against the British off Sjællands Odde, and the grave of three British airmen, whose plane was shot down over Sejerø Bay in 1943.

Transport
Ferry company Molslinjen operates catamaran services from the ferry port to the south of the tip of Sjællands Odde, Odden Færgehavn, to Ebeltoft since 1966 and Aarhus (since 1999) in Jutland.
The modern catamarans operated by Mols-Linien carry large numbers of cars, which results in periodic heavy traffic on the route (Rute 21) from the peninsula, via Vig to Holbæk and then to Copenhagen.

Gallery

References

Rxternal links

 Source
 Source

Peninsulas of Zealand
Geography of Odsherred Municipality
Peninsulas of the Baltic Sea
Odsherred Municipality